This is a list of electricity-generating power stations in the U.S. state of Maryland, sorted by type and name. In 2019, Maryland had a total summer capacity of 14,609 MW through all of its power plants, and a net generation of 39,329 GWh. The corresponding electrical energy generation mix was 38.1% nuclear, 37.1% natural gas, 14.5% coal, 5.6% hydroelectric, 1.3% wind, 1.2% solar, 1.2% biomass, 0.8% non-biogenic waste, and 0.2% petroleum.  Small-scale solar, which includes customer-owned PV panels, delivered an additional net 965 GWh of energy to Maryland's electrical grid.  This was nearly twice the generation of the state's utility-scale PV plants.

Nuclear plants

Fossil-fuel plants

Coal

Retired Coal

Natural gas

Petroleum
Chalk Point Generating Station
Dickerson Generating Station
 Easton Power Plant
Herbert A. Wagner Generating Station
Morgantown Generating Station
Perryman Generating Station
 Philadelphia Road Generating Station
Vienna Generating Station
 Westport Generating station

Renewable plants
Data from the U.S. Energy Information Administration serves as a general reference.

Waste-to-energy
Montgomery County Resource Recovery Facility
Wheelabrator Incinerator

Wind

Criterion Wind Project
Fair Wind
Fourmile Ridge
Roth Rock Wind Farm

Solar

Annapolis Solar Park
Fort Detrick Solar
Great Bay Solar
Longview Solar
Maryland Solar
Mount Saint Mary's
Rockfish Solar
Wye Mills

Hydroelectric

Conowingo Dam
Deep Creek Dam

Biomass
 Back River Waste Water Treatment
 Brown Station Road Plant
 East Correctional Institute
 Eastern Landfill Gas
 Millersville LFG
 Montgomery County Oaks LFG
 Wicomico

See also

List of power stations in the United States

References

Energy in Maryland
Lists of buildings and structures in Maryland
Maryland